The 2014 Preakness Stakes  was the 139th running of the Preakness Stakes.  The race was scheduled to start
at 6:18 pm Eastern Daylight Time (EDT) on May 17, 2014 at Pimlico Race Course and was run as the twelfth race on a racecard with thirteen races. The race was won by California Chrome, giving him a chance to win the Triple Crown at Belmont. It is the thirty-fourth time a horse has won the first two legs of the Triple Crown.  The Maryland Jockey Club reported a track record total attendance of 123,469, the second highest attendance for American thoroughbred racing events in North America during 2014. 
 
The payout to the winning horses in the 2014 Stakes was US$1,500,000, an increase of half a million dollars from the previous year.

Field
The 2014 Kentucky Derby winner California Chrome was the morning line favorite at 3–5 and drew the number three post position.  Only two horses who ran in the Kentucky Derby entered the Preakness, General a Rod and Ride on Curlin, both with new jockeys.

The other entrants included Pablo Del Monte, whose owners opted not to run in the Kentucky Derby after he was made eligible by the scratch of Hoppertunity; Federico Tesio winner Kid Cruz; Illinois Derby winner Dynamic Impact; Bayern, trained by Bob Baffert; Social Inclusion, who ran third in the Wood Memorial and was second favorite on the morning line at 5–1; and the filly Ria Antonia, winner of the Breeders' Cup Juvenile Fillies (via disqualification of first-place finisher She's a Tiger) and sixth in the Kentucky Oaks.

The addition of Ria Antonia marked the first time that a female horse, a woman jockey, and a woman trainer had all competed in the Preakness in the same year; Rosie Napravnik rode Bayern, and Kid Cruz was trained by Linda Rice.

Race description

The attendance at Pimlico was record-breaking at 123,469, surpassing the 2012 record of 121,309.  The infield festival featured live performances by Nas and Lorde. Total parimutuel handle for the entire race card was the sixth largest in Preakness day wagering history at $83.8 million, of which $53.7 million was bet just on the Preakness.

California Chrome proved victorious at the Preakness in 1:54.84, 1-1/2 lengths ahead of rival Ride on Curlin, who was followed by Social Inclusion. Pablo Del Monte and Ria Antonia took early leads out of the gate, but quickly fell behind and were surpassed. The winner starting at 3–5 odds, the same as the morning line but was 1–2 by post time. California Chrome made a clean start out of the gate, remained in the top three throughout the entire race, made his bid for the lead at the far turn and moved to the front at the top of the stretch, holding off a challenge from Social Inclusion, who tired and finished third, 6-1/2 lengths behind second-place finisher Ride on Curlin, who finished well, but was still 1-1/2 lengths behind the winner.

Payout 
The 139th Preakness payout schedule

 $2 Exacta: (3-10) $18.20
 $2 Trifecta: (3-10-8) $76.00
 $1 Superfecta: (3-10-8-2) $173.80

The full chart

Key:
† filly (carries 121 lb.)

 Winning breeder: Steve Coburn & Perry Martin
 Final time: 1:54.84
 Margins:  lengths,  lengths
 Track: Fast
 Attendance: 123,469

See also
 2014 Kentucky Derby
 2014 Belmont Stakes

References

Preakness Stakes races
Preakness Stakes
Preakness Stakes
Preakness Stakes
Preakness Stakes
Horse races in Maryland